Vladimir Shishkin (born 26 July 1991) is a Russian professional boxer.

Professional career
Shishkin made his professional debut on 31 July 2016, scoring a fourth-round technical knockout (TKO) victory against Andrejs Loginovs at the Arena Riga in Latvia.

After compiling a record of 5–0 (2 KOs), he defeated Sergey Khomitsky via seventh-round TKO on 30 May 2018 at the Zimney Stadion in Saint Petersburg, capturing the vacant WBA Asia interim super-middleweight title.

Shishkin was scheduled to face Andrey Sirotkin on 21 July at the Olympic Stadium in Moscow. Sirotkin was forced to withdraw from the bout after suffering an injury during training, subsequently being replaced by Gasan Gasanov. With the vacant WBA Continental (Europe) super-middleweight title on the line, Shishkin defeated Gasanov via fifth-round TKO to capture his second professional title.

Professional boxing record

References

External links

Living people
1991 births
Russian male boxers
Super-middleweight boxers